Dulcamara means "bittersweet" (literally "sweet-bitter"). It can refer to:
 Solanum dulcamara, a plant
 Dulcamara, a synonym and proposed section of the genus Solanum
 Dulcamara, or the Little Duck and the Great Quack, an 1866 play by W. S. Gilbert
 Dr. Dulcamara, a character in L'elisir d'amore, an opera by Gaetano Donizetti